Anthony Municipal Airport  is a city-owned public-use airport located three miles (5 km) northwest of the central business district of Anthony, a city in Harper County, Kansas, United States.

History

This airport was originally built in the 1930s by local aviator J. Howard Wilcox.  The airport added a beacon in 1938 which is still in use today. In December 1941, Wilcox was asked to head the Kansas Wing of the newly organized Civil Air Patrol (CAP). The Anthony Airport became the Kansas Wing headquarters of the Civil Air Patrol on December 21, 1941.

This airport was turned into a CAP training base for the State of Kansas. The Army stationed several Boeing B-17s here. In the late 1950s the CAP Wing Headquarters moved from Anthony to a larger city, and Wilcox began to further his career in Law.

CAP returned to Anthony in 2008 as a Color Guard in the Anthony Balloon Fest Parade.  Although CAP has not yet been re-established in Anthony, CAP has made several appearances in the Harper County Fair Parade in Harper, Kansas, and in the Anthony Christmas Parade. The Civil Air Patrol squadrons that have performed in the parades are Emerald City Composite Squadron out of Wichita, and Cunningham Composite Squadron out of Cunningham.

Facilities and aircraft 

For the 12-month period ending January 18, 2007, the airport had 6,200 general aviation aircraft operations, an average of 16 per day. At that time there were 11 aircraft based at this airport:
91% single-engine and 9% multi-engine.

References 

 Anthony Republican December 1941-December 1961

External links

Airports in Kansas
Buildings and structures in Harper County, Kansas